John Donald M. MacKay (August 13, 1871July 23, 1923) was a Michigan politician.

Early life and education
John Donald M. MacKay was born on August 13, 1871 in Atlantic, Iowa to parents Thomas Compton and Johanna MacKay. John was of Highland Scottish descent. With his family, John moved to Spink County, South Dakota in 1880, where he lived on his father's ranch. He went to district schools in South Dakota, and high school in Atlantic. In 1895, John graduated from Olivet College with a Bachelor of Arts degree. In 1895, John graduated from Detroit College of Law with an LL. B. degree.

Career

In 1895, MacKay was admitted to the bar. He then began practicing law in Detroit as a member of the law firm Stellwagen, MacKay and Wade, which was formerly known as Cutcheon, Stellwagen and MacKay. MacKay specialized in corporation law. At some point, MacKay served on the board of trustees for Olivet College. MacKay was a member of notable clubs, such as the Detroit Club and the Detroit Country Club. He was a member of multiple bar associations: the Detroit Bar Association, the Michigan State Bar Association and the American Bar Association. He also had mining interests in Montana. On November 8, 1904, MacKay was elected to the Michigan Senate where he represented the 2nd district from January 4, 1905 to December 31, 1910. On November 3, 1908, MacKay was elected to the Michigan Senate where he represented the 3rd district from January 6, 1909 to December 31, 1910.

Personal life

On January 17, 1900, MacKay married Isabella Hosie in Wayne County, Michigan. MacKay was Presbyterian.

Death

MacKay died on July 23, 1923.

References

1871 births
1923 deaths
American people of Scottish descent
Detroit College of Law alumni
Lawyers from Detroit
Republican Party Michigan state senators
Politicians from Detroit
Presbyterians from Michigan
19th-century American lawyers
20th-century American lawyers
20th-century American politicians